Bachir Messaitfa is the Algerian Deputy Minister of Statistics and Forward Planning. He was appointed as deputy minister on 2 January 2020.

References 

Living people
21st-century Algerian politicians
Algerian politicians
Government ministers of Algeria
Year of birth missing (living people)